is a Japanese actress from Osaka Prefecture. She is affiliated with Sun Music Production.

On August 8, 2014, she changed her stage name from Mariko Nakatsu which is also her real name to Mari Nakatsu.

Filmography

Anime television
Zoobles! (2011), SunSan, Chip, Mato
Ginga e Kickoff!! (2012), Erika Takatō
The Pet Girl of Sakurasou (2012), Nanami Aoyama
Kingdom Season 2 (2013), Kō
Danball Senki (2013), Suzune Kinbako
Saki: Zenkoku-hen (2014), Kinue Atago
Hello!! Kin-iro Mosaic (2015), Kana Higurashi
Magical Girl Lyrical Nanoha ViVid (2015), Jiikurinde Eremia
Tantei Kageki Milky Holmes TD (2015), Miki Hōjō
Heavy Object (2016), Charm

Video Games
Danball Senki (2013), Suzune Kinbako
The Pet Girl of Sakurasou (2013), Nanami Aoyama
Yome Collection (2013), Nanami Aoyama

TV Drama

References

External links
Mari Nakatsu Official blog 
Official agency profile 

1983 births
Living people
Japanese actresses
Japanese video game actresses
Japanese voice actresses
People from Higashiōsaka
Voice actresses from Osaka Prefecture